This is a list of episodes of the Chinese variety show Keep Running in season 6. The show airs on ZRTG: Zhejiang Television.

Episodes

Notes

References

External links
Keep Running Official Homepage

2018 Chinese television seasons